The Australian Defence College (ADC) comprises three joint education and training organisations operated by the Australian Defence Force in Canberra, Australian Capital Territory:
 the War College, 
 the Australian Defence Force Training Centre (ADFTC), and 
 the Australian Defence Force Academy (ADFA).

The ADC is commanded by a two-star officer, currently Major General Mick Ryan since January 2018. Each of the educational organisations is commanded by a one-star officer or Colonel (equivalent), titled Commandant of their organisation.

In 2019, the Australian Defence College implemented its biggest organisational reform in almost two decades. The changes included the amalgamation of the Centre for Defence and Strategic Studies and the Australian Command and Staff College to form the Australian War College, to focus on Joint Professional Military Education. Individual training delivered by the Australian Defence Force Warfare Training Centre, Peace Operations Training Centre, Defence Force Chaplains College, Defence International Training Centre, and Defence Force School of Languages was centralised in the Australian Defence Force Training Centre.

The first two organisations are sited at a campus at Weston, ACT.

History of Australian Defence College
The current Australian Defence College has its origins in the report of the Defence Efficiency Review from May 1997. The report recommended sweeping changes to officer education in the Australian Defence Force.

The Australian Defence College (ADC) was officially opened on 18 January 1999 by the Hon Bruce Scott MP, Minister Assisting the Minister of Defence. The founding Commander of the ADC was Rear Admiral Raydon Gates CSM, RAN.

The first two courses that were run at the new ADC in 1999 were the Defence Staff Course (DSC) and the Defence and Strategic Studies Course (DSSC). In 2000 these two courses were merged to form one course, the Defence and Strategic Studies Course.

On 14 March 2001 the then Governor–General, Sir William Deane, officially opened the Australian Command and Staff College (ACSC). Prior to this date, middle management officer Command and Staff training was conducted at separate single Service staff colleges:
 the RAN Staff Course at HMAS Penguin in Sydney, New South Wales;
 the Army Command and Staff Course was conducted at Fort Queenscliff in Victoria; and
 the RAAF Staff Course at RAAF Fairbairn in the Australian Capital Territory.

On 1 October 2007 the Australian Defence Force Warfare Centre (ADFWC) came under command of the Commander ADC, as part of the Vice Chief of the Defence Force Group.

In July 2017, the Australian Defence College transferred to the new Joint Capabilities Group.

Commanders

Australian War College

On 15 February 2019, the Hon Darren Chester (Australian politician) MP, Minister for Defence Personnel, officially opened the new Australian War College.

The War College delivers the Australian Defence Force's core Joint Professional Military Education continuum through the War College's two principal courses: The Australian Command and Staff Course and The Defence Strategic Studies Course.

Both courses use distinguished guest lecturers to give the course a practical context. Visiting Fellows include prominent academics from overseas.

Commandants
The following is a list of the Commandants, Australian War College.

Defence and Strategic Studies Course (DSSC)

"Joint Services Staff College" is also the former name of the British Joint Service Defence College 
In 2019, the Centre for Defence and Strategic Studies (CDSS) – formerly known as the Australian College of Defence and Strategic Studies, and the Joint Services Staff College - was amalgamated with the Australian Command and Staff College to form the Australian War College, which is now responsible for the delivery of CDSS' main course, the Defence and Strategic Studies Course (DSSC). The DSSC is intended for senior Service and civilian officers of mainly Colonel (equiv) rank.

The intensive Defence and Strategic Studies Course (DSSC) primarily uses study modules from Australian universities. The DSSC is intended to give officers of the Australian Defence Force, the Australian Public Service and overseas participants the knowledge and skills required by senior leaders and managers operating in the national security environment.
The interconnected thematic core curriculum blocks that are: 
 Development of Strategic Thought; 
 Command, Strategic Leadership and Management; 
 The Contemporary Strategic Setting; 
 Future Strategic Settings; 
 Australian Strategic policy – Past, Present and Future; and 
 Higher Command and Staff Studies.

Successful completion of the DSSC is considered necessary for promotion to Brigadier (equivalent) rank in the Australian Defence Force.

Past Principals Centre for Defence and Strategic Studies (CDSS)

The following is a list of the Principals, Centre for Defence and Strategic Studies.

Australian Command and Staff Course (ACSC)

The Australian Command and Staff Course intellectually prepares future leaders to fulfil command and staff appointments in single-Service, joint, multi-national and interagency environment.

Other courses conducted are:
 RAN Staff Acquaint Course; and
 Army Reserve Command and Staff Course

Other courses are preparations for these:
 Overseas Course Member Orientation Period (OCMOP) 
 ACSC Course Member Orientation Week 
 Defence International Training Centre
 Australian Defence Force Peace Operations Training Centre Course 
 Directing Staff Development Course (DSDP)

The Australian Command and Staff College (ACSC) conducts courses intended to prepare field ranking officers (Major / Lieutenant Commander / Squadron Leader) and their Defence civilian equivalent for staff duties and subsequent promotion to command positions.

Past Commandants Australian Command and Staff College (ACSC)

The following is a list of the Commanders, Australian Command and Staff College.

Roof collapse
At about 4.15pm on 30 January 2006, part of the roof collapsed into the staff offices on the second floor used by the ACSC at the Geddes building. Several staff had minor injuries. Classes were moved to the ADFA campus while restoration work was completed.

Australian Defence Force Training Centre (ADFTC)

The Australian Defence Force Training Centre was stood up in 2019 following the Australian Defence College organisational changes and centralised joint individual training for Defence, Government Agencies and selected foreign students.

The ADFTC is as follows:

 Australian Defence Force Warfare Training Centre, providing individual joint training for Defence, Government Agencies and selected foreign students, as well as assisting with training of joint headquarters staff for operations and job-specific training in the concepts of joint warfare.
 The Peace Operations Training Centre is a joint, inter-agency and multi-national training establishment and a recognised United Nations (UN) training provider. It prepares Australian military, foreign military and civilians from other government departments to deploy on operations. The Peace Operations Training Centre also delivers the Australian Defence Force Gender Advisor Course, training students to apply a Gender perspective into policy, and planning at all levels.
 Defence Force Chaplains College provides Initial, Intermediate and Senior level instruction to Australian Defence Force Chaplains.
 Defence Force School of Languages, which celebrates its 75th anniversary this year, teaches and assesses Australian Defence Force and civilian members in Languages Other Than English (LOTE). The courses are unique within Australian academic institutions due to the intensity of delivery and the focus on military and strategic contexts.
 Defence International Training Centre is the entry point for international military members on arrival in Australia, providing language training, teacher training and cultural familiarisation courses. Defence International Training Centre is a major contributor to Defence regional engagement especially in the South-East Asian and South Pacific regions.

Commandants
The following is a list of the Commandants, Australian Defence Force Training Centre.

Australian Defence Force Academy (ADFA)

The Australian Defence Force Academy (ADFA) is the educational institution for trainee officers of the Australian Defence Force, offering three- and four-year primary degrees, and postgraduate degrees.

ADFA's academic services are provided by the University of New South Wales Canberra and academic and some support staff are employed by the university. Military staff conduct a separate Joint Military Education and Training program to prepare the trainee officers for their military careers.

The campus is in Campbell, ACT, and is located between Russell, Campbell Park and Duntroon.

Current Commandant: Commodore Peter James Leavy (ADFA Class of '86)

Rector: Professor Michael Frater

References and notes

External links
Australian Defence College
Australian War College
Australian Defence Force Training Centre
Australian Defence Force Academy
History of the College

Education in the Australian Capital Territory
Australian tertiary institutions
Military education and training in Australia